The Australia-China Youth Association (ACYA) is an international non-governmental organization that aims to strengthen ties between young people in Australia and China through bilateral initiatives in the areas of Careers, Education, and People-to-People Exchange. ACYA is a volunteer-run nonprofit organization that takes the form of a grassroots community comprising over 7000 members spread across 15 Chapters in Australia, including all Group of Eight universities, and 6 city-based Chapters in Beijing, Shanghai, Chengdu, Guangzhou, Wuhan, and Taipei. ACYA's major sponsors are the Australian National University and the Australia-China Council of the Department of Foreign Affairs and Trade (Australia). ACYA was one of only three youth organisations to be commended by name in the Australian Government's 2012 'Australia in the Asian Century' White Paper. ACYA was founded in 2008 in Wudaokou, Beijing, by three Australian National University undergraduate students—Henry Makeham, Huw Pohlner and Dominic Delany—then on exchange at Peking University, Renmin University and Tsinghua University, respectively.

Activities
ACYA Chapters run hundreds of social, academic, and professional events each year and create communities for Australian and Chinese young people to discover each other's cultures, languages, and perspectives, and forge lasting friendships that bridge the cultural divide.

ACYA administers significant educational scholarship programs that enable scores of Australian students annually to learn Chinese language at Renmin University of China and National Taiwan Normal University, and a 2-year MBA scholarship for an Australian student to study at the Renmin University School of Business.

ACYA also manages innovative cross-cultural internship programs with Austrade, Peking University Australian Studies Centre, Tsinghua University, Asialink, Australia China Business Council, Australian Chamber of Commerce in Beijing, China Policy, and Thirst NGO.

ACYA's signature event is the biannual Australia-China Emerging Leaders Summit (ACELS), which brings together ACYA leaders from across Australia and China for intensive workshops on leadership in the Australia-China space, and has been hailed by Xinhua as "fortifying the fortunes and feelings of the two key trading partners...while also ensuring the tidal ebbs and flows of politics and power plays in no way hinder the growing ties between Chinese and Australian youths." ACELS has grown to become the largest bilateral forum connecting youth from Australia and China and has received endorsement from high-level industry leaders and government officials.

Role in Australia-China Relations
ACYA is prominent within the youth and education arenas of Australia-China relations, being acknowledged by the Australia-China Council as one of the key youth initiatives "that helps to connect younger generations of Australians and Chinese". ACYA has been recognized by Australian media such as The Australian Financial Review, The Australian, and Triple J as a major proponent of bilateral youth engagement and 'Asia literacy' in Australia.

ACYA is also the progenitor of other prominent Australia-China youth initiatives such as the  Australia-China Youth Dialogue, Australia-China Young Professionals Initiative, and Engaging China Project.

Organizational structure
ACYA is administered by a national executive, consisting of the following positions:

 President
 Managing Director
 Treasurer
 Secretary
 Australia Manager
 China Manager
 Operations Manager
 Alumni Manager
 Partnerships Manager
 Careers Director
 Education Director
 People-to-People Director
 Media Director
 Publications Director
 IT Director
 Translations Director

A similar structure is replicated throughout local-level ACYA Chapters, with each Chapter led by a Chapter President who reports directly to the National Executive.

References

External links
 
 ACYA on Facebook
 ACYA on Twitter
 ACYA on Weibo

Student organisations in Australia
Australia–China relations